Elizabeth Gilbert (born July 18, 1969) is an American journalist and author. She is best known for her 2006 memoir, Eat, Pray, Love, which has sold over 12 million copies and has been translated into over 30 languages. The book was also made into a film of the same name in 2010.

Early life
Gilbert was born in Waterbury, Connecticut in 1969. Her father, John Gilbert, was a chemical engineer at Uniroyal; her mother, Carole, was a nurse and established a Planned Parenthood clinic.

When Gilbert was four, her parents bought a Christmas tree farm in Litchfield, Connecticut. The family lived in the country with no neighbors; they did not own a television or record player. Consequently, the family read a great deal, and Gilbert and her older sister Catherine Gilbert Murdock entertained themselves by writing books and plays. Gilbert has said that her parents were not hippies but modern pioneers, "My parents are the only people I've ever known who made their own goat's-milk yogurt and voted for Reagan twice. That's a Venn diagram that doesn't include anyone else."

Gilbert attended New York University. She resisted taking literature classes and writing workshops and stated in an interview, "I never thought that the best place for me to find my voice would be in a room filled with twenty other people trying to find their voices. I was a big moralist about it, actually. I felt that if I was writing on my own, I didn't need a class, and if I wasn't writing on my own, I didn't deserve one." Instead of attending graduate school, Gilbert decided to create her own education through work and travel.

Career

Early career

After college, Gilbert moved to Philadelphia and worked as a waitress or bartender to save up enough money to travel. Gilbert stated in a New York Times interview that she was influenced by Ernest Hemingway's early career, and his short story collection, In Our Time. Gilbert believed that writers find stories not in a seminar room but by investigating the world. She held various jobs including a trail cook, bartender, and waitress while storing up experiences for her writing.

Journalism
Esquire published Gilbert's short story "Pilgrims" in 1993, under the headline "The Debut of an American Writer". She was the first unpublished short story writer to debut in Esquire since Norman Mailer. This led to steady work as a journalist for a variety of national magazines, including Spin, GQ, The New York Times Magazine, Allure, Real Simple, and Travel + Leisure. As stated in the memoir Eat, Pray, Love, Gilbert made a career as a highly paid freelance writer.

Her 1997 GQ article, "The Muse of the Coyote Ugly Saloon", a memoir of Gilbert's time as a bartender at the very first Coyote Ugly table dancing bar located in the East Village section of New York City, was the basis for the feature film Coyote Ugly (2000). She adapted her 1998 GQ article, "The Last American Man" into a biography of the modern woodsman and naturalist Eustace Conway in The Last American Man. "The Ghost", a profile of Hank Williams III published by GQ in 2000, was included in Best American Magazine Writing 2001.

Books
Gilbert's first book, Pilgrims (Houghton Mifflin 1997), a collection of short stories, received the Pushcart Prize and was a finalist for the PEN/Hemingway Award. This was followed by her novel Stern Men (Houghton Mifflin 2000), selected by The New York Times as a "Notable Book". In 2002, she published The Last American Man (2002), which was nominated for National Book Award in non-fiction.

Eat, Pray, Love 
In 2006, Gilbert published Eat, Pray, Love: One Woman's Search for Everything Across Italy, India and Indonesia (Viking, 2006), a chronicle of her year of "spiritual and personal exploration" spent traveling abroad. She financed her world travel for the book with a $200,000 publisher's advance after pitching the concept in a book proposal. The best-seller has been critiqued by some writers as "priv-lit" ("a literature of privilege") and a "calculated business decision". The memoir appeared on the New York Times Best Seller list of nonfiction in the spring of 2006, and was still #2 on the list 88 weeks later, in October 2008. It was optioned for a film by Columbia Pictures, which released Eat Pray Love, starring Julia Roberts as Gilbert, on August 13, 2010. Gilbert appeared on The Oprah Winfrey Show in 2007, and has reappeared on the show to further discuss the book, her philosophy, and the film. She was named one of the 100 most influential people in the world by Time magazine, and named to Oprah's SuperSoul 100 list of visionaries and influential leaders.

Committed 
Gilbert's fifth book, Committed: A Skeptic Makes Peace with Marriage, was released by Viking Press in January 2010. The book is somewhat of a sequel to Eat, Pray, Love in that it takes up Gilbert's life story where her bestseller left off. Committed also reveals Gilbert's decision to marry Jose Nunes (referred to in the book as Felipe), a Brazilian man she met in Manu, Indonesia. The book is an examination of the institution of marriage from several historical and modern perspectives—including those of people, particularly women, reluctant to marry. In the book, Gilbert also includes perspectives on same-sex marriage and compares this to interracial marriage prior to the 1970s.

In 2012, she republished At Home on the Range, a 1947 cookbook written by her great-grandmother, food columnist Margaret Yardley Potter. Gilbert published her second novel, The Signature of All Things, in 2013.

Big Magic 
In 2015, Gilbert published Big Magic: Creative Living Beyond Fear, a self-help book that provides instructions on how to live a life as creative as hers. The book is broken down into six sections: Courage, Enchantment, Permission, Persistence, Trust, and Divinity. Advice in Big Magic focuses on overcoming self-doubt, avoiding perfectionism, and agenda setting, among other topics. Gilbert continued the work started in Big Magic with her Magic Lessons podcast in which she interviews famous creatives including Brene Brown and Sarah Jones.

A review of Big Magic in Slate stated that most of the advice in the book is matter-of-fact, but that, "Gilbert comes bearing reports from a new world where untold splendors lie waiting for those bold and hard-working enough to claim them. What's unclear is how many could successfully follow on her trail." The Seattle Times described the book as, "funny, perceptive and full of down-to-earth advice."

Literary influences
In an interview, Gilbert mentioned The Wizard of Oz with nostalgia, adding, "I am a writer today because I learned to love reading as a child—and mostly on account of the Oz books..." She has said she was particularly influenced by Charles Dickens, and has noted this in many interviews. She identifies Marcus Aurelius's Meditations as her favorite book on philosophy. She also declared Jack Gilbert (no relation) as "the poet laureate of my life" when she succeeded him as a writer-in-residence at the University of Tennessee in 2006.

Philanthropy
In 2015, Gilbert and several other authors including Cheryl Strayed participated in fundraising efforts for Syrian refugees which raised over $1 million in 31 hours. In 2016, Gilbert shared a video of herself singing a karaoke version of Bonnie Tyler's "Total Eclipse of the Heart" to raise money for BlinkNow Foundation, an organization inspired in part by Eat, Pray, Love.

Personal life
In a 2015 article for The New York Times titled "Confessions of a Seduction Addict", Gilbert wrote that she "careened from one intimate entanglement to the next—dozens of them—without so much as a day off between romances." She acknowledged, "Seduction was never a casual sport for me; it was more like a heist, adrenalizing and urgent. I would plan the heist for months, scouting out the target, looking for unguarded entries. Then I would break into his deepest vault, steal all his emotional currency and spend it on myself." She realised that, "I might indeed win the man eventually. But over time (and it wouldn't take long), his unquenchable infatuation for me would fade, as his attention returned to everyday matters. This always left me feeling abandoned and invisible; love that could be quenched was not nearly enough love for me".

Gilbert was married to Michael Cooper, whom she met while working at the Coyote Ugly Saloon, from 1994 to 2002. The marriage ended when Gilbert left Cooper for another man.

In 2007, Gilbert married José Nunes, whom she met in Bali while on the travels she describes in Eat, Pray, Love. Gilbert and Nunes lived in Frenchtown, New Jersey; together they ran a large Asian import store called Two Buttons until they sold it in 2015.

On July 1, 2016, Gilbert announced on her Facebook page that she and Nunes were separating, saying that the split was "very amicable" and that their reasons were "very personal". On September 7, 2016, Gilbert published a Facebook post saying that she was in a relationship with her female best friend, writer Rayya Elias, and that this relationship was related to the breakup of her marriage. The relationship began because Gilbert realized her feelings for Elias following the latter's terminal cancer diagnosis. On June 6, 2017, the two celebrated a commitment ceremony with close family and friends. The ceremony was not legally binding. Elias died on January 4, 2018.

On March 25, 2019, Gilbert posted on Instagram that she was in a relationship with United Kingdom-born photographer Simon MacArthur, who was also a close friend of Elias. In an interview in February 2020, she shared that she and MacArthur were no longer together, calling the relationship "short lived".

Works

Story collections
 Pilgrims (1997)

Novels
 Stern Men (2000)
 The Signature of All Things (2013) 
City of Girls (2019)

Biographies
 The Last American Man (2002)

Memoirs
 Eat, Pray, Love: One Woman's Search for Everything Across Italy, India and Indonesia (2006) 
 Committed: A Skeptic Makes Peace with Marriage (2010) 
 Big Magic: Creative Living Beyond Fear (2015)

Notable articles
 "The Muse of Coyote Ugly Saloon". GQ (March 1997)
 "The Last American Man". GQ (February 1998)

As contributor
 The KGB Bar Reader: Buckle Bunnies (1998)
 Why I Write: Thoughts on the Craft of Fiction (contributor) (1999)
 The Best American Magazine Writing 2001: The Ghost (2001)
 The Best American Magazine Writing 2003: Lucky Jim (2003)

References

External links 

 
 
 Elizabeth Gilbert interview at Sydney Opera House (video, 2012) Sydney Opera House

1969 births
Living people
21st-century American novelists
Converts to Hinduism
21st-century American women writers
21st-century American memoirists
American women memoirists
American women short story writers
American women novelists
American travel writers
LGBT people from Connecticut
LGBT memoirists
American LGBT novelists
New York University alumni
People from Frenchtown, New Jersey
People from Litchfield, Connecticut
Writers from Waterbury, Connecticut
American women travel writers
Novelists from Connecticut
Novelists from New York (state)
American Hindus
American women essayists
American people of Swedish descent
21st-century American short story writers
21st-century American essayists
LGBT Hindus